The Footballer of the Year of Argentina (in Spanish: Olimpia de Plata al Mejor Futbolista, that literally translates to "Silver Olimpia to the Best Footballer) is a yearly award given by the Argentine Sports Journalists' Circle (Círculo de Periodistas Deportivos de la República Argentina) as one of the Olimpia Awards, the most important sports award in Argentina.

The Olimpia is awarded in the sport of association football and, since 2008, is shared by the best player of the local league (who wins the Olimpia de Plata al Fútbol Local) and the best Argentine playing abroad (Olimpia de Plata al Fútbol del Exterior).

Up to 2008, the award was not shared, and was either given to the best player of Argentine nationality of the season (regardless if he plays in the local league or abroad), or to the best foreign footballer of the local league. It is unclear when Argentine footballers playing abroad and expatriate players in the country started being eligible. Mario Kempes in 1978 was the first Argentine to receive the award while playing abroad. Kempes was playing in the Spanish league for Valencia CF at the time, and had been a key player in the Argentina national team World Cup winning campaign of that year. On the other hand, Uruguayan Enzo Francescoli was the first foreign player to receive the award (in 1985, playing for River Plate).

Lionel Messi is the award's all-time record holder with fifteen wins, seven of which were in a row. He is also the current (2022) holder of the award.

Winners
All players and clubs are Argentine, unless otherwise noted.

Most wins

See also
Olimpia Award

References

External links
 Premios Olimpia at the Círculo de Periodistas Deportivos 
 Argentina - Player of the Year at the RSSSF

Association football player of the year awards by nationality
Footballers in Argentina
Awards established in 1970
1970 establishments in Argentina
Argentine awards
Annual sporting events in Argentina
Association football player non-biographical articles